Jane Richmond (née Garwell, born 16 June 1961) is a Welsh chess Woman FIDE Master (FM), British Women's Chess Championship winner (1982), twelve-times Welsh Women's Chess Championship winner (1976, 1978, 1980, 1981, 1983, 1991, 1992, 1993, 1994, 1995, 1996, 2004), Chess Olympiad individual silver medal winner (1978).

Biography
Jane Richmond has won twelve times in the Welsh Women's Chess Championships: 1976, 1978, 1980, 1981 (jointly), 1983, 1991 (jointly), 1992, 1993, 1994, 1995, 1996, and 2004. Also she won British Women's Chess Championships in 1982.

Jane Richmond played for Wales in the Chess Olympiads:
 In 1976, at third board in the 7th Chess Olympiad (women) in Haifa (+3, =4, -4),
 In 1978, at first reserve board in the 8th Chess Olympiad (women) in Buenos Aires (+8, =3, -1) and won individual silver medal,
 In 1980, at first reserve board in the 9th Chess Olympiad (women) in Valletta (+7, =2, -4),
 In 1984, at third board in the 26th Chess Olympiad (women) in Thessaloniki (+5, =5, -3),
 In 1986, at third board in the 27th Chess Olympiad (women) in Dubai (+5, =4, -4),
 In 1988, at second board in the 28th Chess Olympiad (women) in Thessaloniki (+6, =3, -2),
 In 1992, at third board in the 30th Chess Olympiad (women) in Manila (+5, =3, -4).

Jane Richmond played for Wales in the European Team Chess Championships:
 In 1989, at second reserve board in the 9th European Team Chess Championship in Haifa (+1, =0, -3).

Jane Richmond played for Wales in the World Youth U26 Team Chess Championship:
 In 1983, at fourth board in the 4th World Youth U26 Team Chess Championship in Chicago (+4, =1, -2).

References

External links

Jane Richmond chess games at 365chess.com
Jane Garwell chess games at 365chess.com

1961 births
Living people
Sportspeople from Solihull
Welsh chess players
Chess Woman FIDE Masters
Chess Olympiad competitors